The 1954 Syracuse Grand Prix was a Formula One race, held on 11 April at the Syracuse Circuit in Sicily. The race was won by Giuseppe Farina driving a Ferrari 625.

Classification

Qualifying

Race

References

Syracuse Grand Prix
Syracuse Grand Prix
Syracuse Grand Prix
Syracuse Grand Prix